La Digne-d'Aval is a commune in the Aude department in southern France.

It is home to several wine producers including Faure and Doutre.

Population

See also
Communes of the Aude department

References

External links

 Official website 

Communes of Aude
Aude communes articles needing translation from French Wikipedia